Iranosauripus is an ichnogenus of dinosaur footprint discovered in Iran that supposedly belonged to a theropod. Iranosauripus supposedly existed during Middle Triassic-Early Jurassic, although the first true dinosaurs, such as Eoraptor, did not exist until the Late Triassic. The type ichnospecies, I. zerabensis  was named in 1975.

See also

 List of dinosaur ichnogenera

References

Dinosaur trace fossils
Fossil taxa described in 1975